Rondell Tony Jones (born May 7, 1971) is a former professional American football player who played safety for five seasons for the Denver Broncos and Baltimore Ravens in the National Football League.

1971 births
Living people
People from Calvert County, Maryland
Players of American football from Maryland
American football safeties
North Carolina Tar Heels football players
Denver Broncos players
Baltimore Ravens players
Ed Block Courage Award recipients